Borum is a surname. Notable people with the surname include:

Andreas Borum (1799-1853), German painter and lithographer 
John R. Borum (1907-1943), United States Naval Reserve lieutenant
Poul Borum (1934–1996), Danish writer, poet and critic
Fred S. "Fritz" Borum (b. 1978), Major general of the United States Air Force
Randy Borum, American professor of Intelligence Studies